The titti  (masaka titti, or  tutti) is a type of bagpipe played in Andhra Pradesh, India, made from an entire goat-skin.  The instrument is described as a goatskin with a double-reed inserted into one leg, and a bamboo blowpipe into the other.  The term tittii is used in Telugu, Kannada, and Malayalam.

History
Several paintings possibly depicting bagpipes are shown in Kerala, from the early eighteenth century.

Colonel James Tod (1782–1835 CE) notes that the Yanadis, a forest tribe in Madras, also play the bagpipes,

Usage
The instrument is often used to provide solely a constant drone. References note the instrument being used as a drone accompaniment by storytellers and singers, as well as for village dance-dramas.

See also

Mashak, a Northern Indian bagpipe
Sruti upanga, a bagpipe of Tamil Nadu.

References

Bagpipes
Indian musical instruments
Culture of Andhra Pradesh
Culture of Kerala
Telugu people